Dennis Curran Haley (August 16, 1893 – July 26, 1966) was president of Suffolk University in Boston, Massachusetts from 1960 to 1965.

Early life
Haley was born on August 16, 1893 in Warren, Massachusetts to William T. Haley and Margaret C. Curran. He received his A.B. in 1915 from the College of the Holy Cross, his A.M. from Holy Cross in 1922, and his Ed.M. from Harvard University in 1925. He graduated from the Boston Normal School in 1916. He was also a student at the Boston University School of Education from 1919 to 1924 and Boston College School of Education from 1923 to 1932. Haley married Margaret Casey, a fellow teacher, in August 1927.

Career
Haley began his teaching career in 1916 at Roxbury High School and was promoted to junior master in 1919. In 1924 he became a science professor at the Boston Teachers' College and in 1926 was promoted to head of the science department. Haley authored and edited various scientific articles and co-authored a science textbook. In 1934 he was named headmaster of Hyde Park High School. In 1940 he was made acting assistant superintendent of schools and received the job on a permanent basis the following year.

Haley served as Boston Public School Superintendent from 1948 until being selected as president of Suffolk University in 1960. During his tenure as superintendent, Haley organized a $60 million building program and established a central administration. At Suffolk he laid the groundwork for the school's new six-story, $3 million dollar building, which opened in September 1966. He retired from Suffolk 1965. Haley died on July 26, 1966 in his summer home in Falmouth, Massachusetts. The Dennis C. Haley Elementary School is named after Haley.

References

College of the Holy Cross alumni
Presidents of Suffolk University
1893 births
1966 deaths
People from Warren, Massachusetts
Harvard Graduate School of Education alumni
Boston University School of Education alumni
Lynch School of Education and Human Development alumni
Boston Public Schools superintendents
20th-century American academics